Sheraton Hotels and Resorts is an international luxury hotel chain owned by Marriott International. As of June 30, 2020, Sheraton operates 446 hotels with 155,617 rooms globally, including locations in North America, Africa, Asia Pacific, Central and South America, Europe, the Middle East and the Caribbean, in addition to 84 hotels with 23,092 rooms in the pipeline.

History

Early years
The origins of Sheraton Hotels date to 1933, when Harvard classmates Ernest Henderson and Robert Moore purchased the Continental Hotel in Cambridge, Massachusetts.

In 1937, Henderson and Moore purchased the Standard Investing Corporation and the International Equities Corporation, combining them into the Standard Equities Corporation, the company through which they would run their hotels. Also in 1937, they purchased their second hotel, and the first as part of the new company, the Stonehaven Hotel in Springfield, Massachusetts, a converted apartment building. Sheraton dates its founding to that year and considers that property its first hotel.

The chain got its name from the third hotel the pair acquired, in Boston, in 1939. It had a large lighted sign on the roof saying "Sheraton Hotel," which was too expensive to change. Instead, Henderson and Moore decided to call all of their hotels by that name.

Henderson and Moore purchased Boston's famed Copley Plaza Hotel in 1941, and continued expanding rapidly, buying existing properties along the East Coast from Maine to Florida.

In 1946, the Standard Equities Corporation merged with the United States Realty and Improvement Corporation, forming the Sheraton Corporation of America, which became the first hotel chain to be listed on the New York Stock Exchange in 1947.

Expansion
In 1949, Sheraton expanded internationally, buying the Ford Hotels chain, with three properties in Toronto, Ottawa and Montreal. They quickly resold the Toronto and Ottawa properties to finance their continued Canadian expansion in 1950, paying $4.8 million to purchase Cardy Hotels, a chain of six properties in Ontario and Quebec.

In 1956, Sheraton paid $30 million to buy the Eppley Hotel Company, which was then the largest privately held hotel business in the United States, with 22 properties across six Midwestern states. Sheraton retained ten of the largest hotels and immediately resold the other twelve. That same year, Sheraton acquired its first motels, purchasing two properties in the suburbs of Syracuse, New York. 

In 1957, Sheraton, which had previously focused on acquiring existing hotels, opened its first newly built hotel, the Philadelphia Sheraton Hotel.

In 1958, Sheraton became the first hotel chain to centralize and computerize its reservations when it introduced Reservatron, the hotel industry's first automatic electronic reservations system.

In 1959, Sheraton acquired its first properties outside North America, purchasing four hotels owned by the Matson Lines on Waikiki Beach in Honolulu, Hawaii - the Moana Hotel, the Royal Hawaiian Hotel, the SurfRider Hotel, and the Princess Kaiulani Hotel. That same year Sheraton opened its first newly built motel, marketed as a "Highway Hotel," the Sheraton Inn, located in Binghamton, New York.

The early 1960s saw the arrival of the first Sheraton hotels outside the US and Canada, with the opening of the Sheraton-Tel Aviv Hotel in Israel in March 1961 and two Caribbean properties in 1962 - the Sheraton-Kingston Hotel in Jamaica and the Sheraton-British Colonial Hotel in Nassau, Bahamas.

In 1962, Sheraton created a franchise division, primarily to operate Sheraton Motor Inns, large highway motels providing free parking.

In 1963, Sheraton opened its first hotel in South America, the Macuto-Sheraton Hotel, outside Caracas, Venezuela.

In 1965, the 100th Sheraton property, the Sheraton-Boston Hotel, opened. 

In 1966, Sheraton opened its first hotel in the Middle East, the Kuwait-Sheraton Hotel.

In 1967, Sheraton unveiled Reservatron II, a computer system for personalized reservations. That same year, Sheraton opened its first hotel in Asia, the Sheraton-Philippines Hotel in Manila; its first hotel in Europe, the Sheraton-Du Cap Hotel on the island of Corsica in France; and its first hotels in Australia, two Sheraton Motor Hotels in Melbourne and Sydney.

ITT Purchase
The multinational conglomerate ITT purchased the chain in 1968. That same year, ITT sold eighteen aging Sheraton properties. Under ITT's ownership, Sheraton quickly moved away from ownership and operation of its properties to a new model of franchising and management, as the chain expanded greatly both in the US and abroad.

In late 1969, Sheraton introduced the hotel industry's first nationwide toll-free number, which displaced two hundred local Sheraton reservation numbers. The radio jingle for "Eight-Oh-Oh, Three-Two-Five, Three-Five Three-Five" "ran throughout the decade and into the eighties" but the jingle's lifespan went even beyond.

In 1970, Sheraton introduced the Sheraton Towers concept, a line of luxury "hotel-within-a-hotel" facilities designed for business travelers and located within Sheraton's largest and most exclusive hotels. The first Sheraton Towers to open was in the chain's flagship Sheraton-Boston Hotel. That same year, Sheraton opened its first hotel in North Africa, the Cario-Sheraton Hotel & Casino. 

In 1971, Sheraton opened its first hotels in Continental Europe, the Sheraton-Stockholm Hotel and the Sheraton-Copenhagen Hotel. 

In 1972, Sheraton opened its first hotel in Sub-Saharan Africa, the Sheraton-Mont Febe Palace in Yaounde, Cameroon.

From 1977 to 1997 the company was headquartered at 60 State Street in Boston.

In 1985, Sheraton became the first western chain to operate a hotel bearing the name of an international companyin the People's Republic of China, when it assumed management of the Great Wall Hotel in Beijing, a financially troubled two-year-old Chinese-American joint venture, which became the Great Wall Sheraton.

By 1987, The New York Times described it as "50 years old, the world's largest hotel chain, and .. consumer-driven."

The chain was rebranded as ITT Sheraton in 1990.

ITT Sheraton Luxury Collection
On January 13, 1992, ITT Sheraton designated 28 of its premier hotels and 33 of the Sheraton Towers as the ITT Sheraton Luxury Collection. The flagship of the division was The St Regis in New York City.

In 1994, ITT Sheraton purchased a controlling interest in the Italian CIGA chain, the Compagnia Italiana Grandi Alberghi, or Italian Grand Hotels Company.  The chain had begun by operating hotels in Italy, but over-expanded across Europe just as a recession hit, and had been seized from its previous owner, the Aga Khan, by its creditors. The majority of these hotels were placed in the ITT Sheraton Luxury Collection, though a few were placed in the Sheraton division.

Four Points by Sheraton
In April 1995, ITT Sheraton introduced a new, mid-range hotel brand, Four Points by Sheraton, to replace the designation of certain hotels as Sheraton Inns.

Starwood purchase 
In 1998, Starwood acquired ITT Sheraton for $13.3 billion, topping an offer by rival Hilton. Under Starwood's leadership, Sheraton began renovating many hotels and expanding the brand's footprint.

Starwood also began marketing The Luxury Collection as a completely separate brand, even though it contained a large number of hotels still named Sheraton. Most of those properties have since been renamed. Only three such hotels remain today - Sheraton Addis in (Addis Ababa, Ethiopia), Sheraton Grande Sukhumvit in (Bangkok, Thailand), and Sheraton Kuwait in (Kuwait City, Kuwait).

Also in 1998, Sheraton joined with the Arabella Hospitality Group in Germany to create ArabellaSheraton, a joint venture under which 14 Arabella Hotels in Germany, Switzerland and Spain were rebranded as ArabellaSheraton Hotels.

In 1999, Sheraton bought the outstanding shares in CIGA, giving it complete ownership.

Marriott purchase
In 2016, Marriott International purchased Starwood Hotels, and the newly merged company again became the world's largest hotel and resort company.  Although the Sheraton brand expresses quality in Asia, aging properties have made the US market more problematic.

Accommodations
(Sheraton only. Excludes The Luxury Collection and Four Points by Sheraton)

Sponsorships
 Hawaii Bowl (2003-2013)

Gallery

See also 

 Eppley Hotel Company
 Holiday Inn
 List of chained-brand hotels
 List of hotels
 Sheraton on the Falls
 Sheraton Hawaii Bowl

Notes

References

External links 

 

American companies established in 1937
Hotels established in 1937
Marriott International brands
ITT Inc.
1937 establishments in Massachusetts
1968 mergers and acquisitions
1998 mergers and acquisitions